Ingulf the Mad is a fantasy novel by American writer Paul Edwin Zimmer, the fourth book in his Dark Border series. It differs from the previous three novels as Istvan Divega, the main character there, does not even make an appearance. Concentrating on Ingulf Mac Fingold and Carrol Mac Lir, it details how they met and how both got the mystic swords they now bear.

References 
 The Lost Prince
 King-Chondos-ride
 A Gathering of Heroes
 Ingulf the Mad

Novels by Paul Edwin Zimmer
High fantasy novels
1989 American novels